John Mark Inienger (16 April 1945 – 8 February 2002) was a Nigerian Army major general who served as ECOMOG field commander in Liberia, governor of Bendel State between 1985 and 1987, during the military administration of General Ibrahim Babangida, and commander of the Brigade of Guards.

Background
Inienger was born on 16 April 1945 at Mbaduku, Vandeikya local government area of Benue State. 
His father was Tiv from Mbaduku, and his mother was from Bebuabung in the Cross River State town of Obudu.
He was educated at the Mkar Primary School, Nigerian Military School, Zaria; Nigerian Army School of Electrical and Mechanical Engineering, Lagos; Nigerian Defence Academy, Kaduna and the Canadian Land Force Command and Staff College, Kingston, Ontario, Canada.

Military career
Inienger was in charge of the 29 Infantry Battalion (1968–1969), battalion commander of the 82 Infantry Battalion (1970–1973), instructor at the Nigerian Army School of Infantry (1975–1976) and battalion commander of the 31 Infantry (1976–1977).
He was battalion commander of the Nigerian Battalion to Lebanon (1980–1981) and commander of the 4 Mechanised Brigade (1984–1985).

In August 1985 General Ibrahim Babangida became the military ruler of Nigeria after a coup against Muhammadu Buhari. Lt. Colonel Inienger was instrumental in the coup, and was rewarded by being appointed military governor of Bendel State, a position he held until December 1987.

Later posts were commander of the Brigade of Guards at Nigerian Army Headquarters, Lagos (1988–1989) and ECOMOG field commander in Liberia (1993–1996). 
During his period as ECOMOG commander during the First Liberian Civil War, conditions were chaotic as warlords sought to capture sufficient territory to be rewarded after the eventual peace. Inienger was quoted as saying "There was an orchestrated campaign of calumny against ECOMOG to discredit it, its neutrality, and impartiality ... ECOMOG was being described as an army of occupation".
By April 1996 his troops were hard pressed to maintain control in the capital, Monrovia, against militiamen engaged in looting. 
Inienger returned from Liberia in 1996 and was appointed commandant of the Armed Forces Command and Staff College, Jaji.

Retirement

In May 1999, the military handed over to the civilian government headed by Olusegun Obasanjo. Within a month, the new government ordered that all officers who had served in the military government for more than six months must retire. 
Inienger was among 100 officers affected by this decision.
He died on 8 February 2002 while travelling by car from Jos to Makurdi.

References

1945 births
2002 deaths
Nigerian military governors
Nigerian Army officers
Instructors at the Nigerian Armed Forces Command and Staff College
Nigerian Military School alumni
Nigerian Army Brigade of Guards Commanders